The 2012–13 GET-ligaen was the 74th season of Norway's premier ice hockey league, Eliteserien (known as GET-ligaen for sponsorship reasons).

Regular season

Final standings
GP = Games played; W = Wins; L = Losses; OTW = Overtime Wins; OTL = Overtime losses; SOW = Shootout Wins; SOL = Shootout losses; GF = Goals for; GA = Goals against; Pts = Points; C = ChampionsSource: pointstreak.com

Scoring leaders
These were the top ten skaters based on points. If the list exceeds ten skaters because of a tie in points, all of the tied skaters are shown.

Leading goaltenders
These were the top five goaltenders based on goals against average.

Attendance

Source:pointstreak.com

Playoffs
After the regular season, the standard of eight teams qualified for the playoffs. In the first and second rounds, the highest remaining seed chooses which of the two lowest remaining seeds to be matched against. In each round the higher-seeded team is awarded home ice advantage. Each best-of-seven series follows a 1–1–1–1–1–1–1 format: the higher-seeded team plays at home for games 1 and 3 (plus 5 and 7 if necessary), and the lower-seeded team at home for games 2, 4 and 6 (if necessary).

Bracket

Source: pointstreak.com

Qualification
After the regular season had ended, the two lowest ranked teams in the league and the two highest ranked teams in the 1. divisjon competed for the right to play in the 2013–14 GET-ligaen. Comet, Ringerike Panthers, Rosenborg and the Tønsberg Vikings took part. The tournament was played from 7 March to 24 March 2013 and was organized according to a double round robin format: each club played the others twice, home and away, for a total of six games. The points system and ranking method used were the same as in the GET-ligaen.

Final standings
GP = Games played; W = Wins; L = Losses; OTW = Overtime Wins; OTL = Overtime losses; SOW = Shootout Wins; SOL = Shootout losses; GF = Goals for; GA = Goals against; Pts = PointsSource: hockey.no

Awards
All-Star team

The following players were selected to the 2012–13 GET-ligaen All-Star team:
Goaltender: Steffen Søberg (Vålerenga)
Defenseman: Craig Schira (Frisk)
Defenseman: Timothy Kunes (Stavanger)
Center: Christian Dahl-Andersen (Stavanger)
Winger: Tyler Donati (Vålerenga)
Winger: Justin Donati (Vålerenga)

Other
Player of the year: Christian Dahl-Andersen (Stavanger)
Coach of the year: Sune Bergman (Frisk)
Playoff MVP: Henrik Holm (Stavanger)

References

External links
  

2012-13
Nor 
GET-ligaen